Livingston Wheeler is an unincorporated community and census-designated place in Eddy County, New Mexico, United States. Its population was 609 as of the 2010 census. The community is located on the southeastern edge of Carlsbad along New Mexico State Road 216.

Geography
Livingston Wheeler is located southeast of Carlsbad and the Pecos River flows past 3/4 mile to the north.

Demographics

Education
It is within the Carlsbad Municipal School District, which operates Carlsbad High School.

References

Census-designated places in New Mexico
Census-designated places in Eddy County, New Mexico